Jim Gallagher may refer to:
Jim Gallagher (American football) (1929–2017), former executive with the Philadelphia Eagles American football team
Jim Gallagher (civil servant), Scottish civil servant and professor
Jim Gallagher (footballer) (born 1931), former Australian rules footballer
Jim Gallagher Jr. (born 1961), American professional golfer
Jimmy Gallagher (1901–1971), Scottish-American soccer player

See also
James Gallagher (disambiguation)